Cheryl Seinen (born 4 August 1995) is a Dutch badminton player. She has won women's doubles events in Romania, Slovakia and the Netherlands, and has also won mixed doubles events in Scandinavia. Seinen was the gold medalist at the 2019 European Games in the women's doubles event with Selena Piek. She competed at the 2020 Summer Olympics.

Achievements

European Games 
Women's doubles

European Championships 
Women's doubles

BWF World Tour (1 runner-up) 
The BWF World Tour, which was announced on 19 March 2017 and implemented in 2018, is a series of elite badminton tournaments sanctioned by the Badminton World Federation (BWF). The BWF World Tour is divided into levels of World Tour Finals, Super 1000, Super 750, Super 500, Super 300, and the BWF Tour Super 100.

Women's doubles

BWF Grand Prix (1 title) 
The BWF Grand Prix had two levels, the Grand Prix and Grand Prix Gold. It was a series of badminton tournaments sanctioned by the Badminton World Federation (BWF) and played between 2007 and 2017.

Women's doubles

  BWF Grand Prix Gold tournament
  BWF Grand Prix tournament

BWF International Challenge/Series (10 titles, 6 runners-up) 
Women's doubles

Mixed doubles

  BWF International Challenge tournament
  BWF International Series tournament
  BWF Future Series tournament

References

External links 
 

1995 births
Living people
People from Roermond
Dutch female badminton players
Badminton players at the 2020 Summer Olympics
Olympic badminton players of the Netherlands
Badminton players at the 2019 European Games
European Games gold medalists for the Netherlands
European Games medalists in badminton
Sportspeople from Limburg (Netherlands)
21st-century Dutch women